Federal modernism is an architectural style which emerged in 1949 after the US General Services Administration (GSA) was created in response to the organizational needs of the US federal government during its time of post-war expansion. It undertook the construction of federal buildings that were built in modern style and shunned ornamentation.

Background 
"The most gigantic business on earth," was established to consolidate the government's building management and general procurement functions. GSA responded to the building needs coming out of the Depression-era and wartime expansion after World War II. The decades of the 1950s, 60s, and 70s stand out as a period of extensive federal government growth, with the number of Federal employees, the Federal budget, and GSA's building-related budget increasing dramatically. Between 1960 and 1976, GSA undertook more than 700 building projects across the United States. These included office buildings, courthouses, post offices, museums, and border stations, located in cities and towns of all sizes.

The design language of the Federal modernism was influenced by historic events such as the civil rights movement and the Vietnam War by way of government policy and planning. Other influences include American ethnography and federal claims for jurisdiction. The architectural design adopted a sharp-edged style and rejected ornamentation. These are demonstrated by some of the earliest structures built in federal modernism in Washington such as the Smithsonian's, the National Air and Space Museum, and the Washington Metro.

Architects associated with Federal modernism include Ludwig Mies van der Rohe, Marcel Breuer, and Walter Gropius.

References

External links
Federal Modernism on the General Services Administration website.
GSA modern building poster galleries.

Modernist architecture in the United States
American architectural styles